The Ensemble Resonanz is a German string ensemble that combines the performance and promotion of Neue Musik with the interpretation of classical repertoire. It sees itself at the interface between chamber orchestra and soloist ensemble for Neue Musik.The ensemble is based in Hamburg, where it is an Ensemble in Residence of the Elbphilharmonie.

History 
The ensemble was founded in 1994 by members of the Junge Deutsche Philharmonie. After stations in Frankfurt and in Diez an der Lahn, in 2002 the Hamburg became the home of the ensemble. There it established itself as the ensemble in residence of the Laeiszhalle – Musikhalle Hamburg with the concert series Resonanzen. Since January 2017, the residency has continued in the chamber music hall of the Elbphilharmonie. In Hamburg's Schanzenviertel, Ensemble Resonanz has established the concert series urban string since 2011, which combines classical music and club culture.

Their awards include the Würth Prize of Jeunesses Musicales Germany (2002) and the Rudolf Stilcken Prize for Cultural Communication. From 2002 to 2004, it was ensemble in residence of the Darmstädter Ferienkurse. From 2005 to 2008, it accompanied the construction of the Elbphilharmonie with the concert series "Kaispeicher entern!" in Hamburg-HafenCity. 

From 2010 to 2013, the cellist Jean-Guihen Queyras was an Artist in Residence of the ensemble. Since September 2013, Tabea Zimmermann has followed him in this position.  Other partners of the ensemble are not only composers, soloists and conductors, but also media artists, directors and performing and visual artists. These included among others Helmut Lachenmann, Beat Furrer, Rebecca Saunders, Fazıl Say, Matthias Goerne, Tabea Zimmermann, Reinhard Goebel, Riccardo Minasi, Imre Kertész, Roger Willemsen, Falk Richter and the RIAS Kammerchor.
Gastspielstationen waren among otheers die Salzburger Festspiele, Bachwoche Ansbach, RuhrTriennale, Wiener Konzerthaus, Philharmonie Luxembourg, Kölner Philharmonie, Théâtre des Bouffes du Nord Paris, Muziekgebouw aan 't IJ, Tonhalle Düsseldorf, Klangspuren, Biennale di Venezia, Philharmonie Berlin, MaerzMusik, Huddersfield Contemporary Music Festival.

Since 2014, the ensemble has been cooperating with the free music radio station  – also based in the Bunker Hamburg – in the context of a monthly classical music programme.

Recordings 
 Mercy seat – winterreise: A Séance between Franz Schubert and Nick Cave (2020, resonanzraum records), with Charly Hübner.
 W.A. Mozart: Symphonies Nos. 39–41 (2020, Harmonia mundi), with Riccardo Minasi
 Bryce Dessner: Tenebre (2019, resonanzraum records), with Moses Sumney
 Joseph Haydn: The Seven Last Words (2019, Harmonia mundi), with Riccardo Minasi
 C.P.E. Bach: Cello Concertos (2018, Harmonia mundi), with Jean-Guihen Queyras, cello
 J.S. Bach: Christmas Oratorio (2017, resonanzraum records)
 C.P.E. Bach: 4 symphonies Wq 183, 6 sonatas Wq 184 (2016, E-flat major).
 C.P.E. Bach: 6 Hamburg Symphonies (2014, E flat major)
 Berg / Schönberg: Lyric Suite / Transfigured Night (2014, Harmonia mundi), with Jean-Guihen Queyras, cello
 Hanns Eisler: Serious Songs & Lieder with Piano (2013, Harmonia mundi), with Matthias Görne
 Julia Wolfe: Cruel Sister / Fuel (2011, cantalouope music), with Brad Lubman
 Manuel Hidalgo: Hacia (2010, kairos), with the WDR Symphony Orchestra Cologne and Lothar Zagrosek
 Iannis Xenakis: Music for Strings (2005, mode records)
 Johann Sebastian Bach: Goldberg Variations (2002, ambitus)
 Michael Gordon: Weather (1997, nonesuch records)

References

External links 
 
 
 

German orchestras
Chamber orchestras
1994 establishments in Germany